Theodoric I (10th century; German: Dietrich, also known as  Thierry) was a nobleman in the Duchy of Saxony, and the oldest traceable member of the House of Wettin.

Biography
Theodoric was born in the early 10th century to unknown parents. He married Jutta of Magdeburg. They had two sons, Dedo and Frederick. He is mentioned as Dedo's father by bishop Thietmar of Merseburg. Dedo is the first known count of Wettin, and Dedo's son, Theodoric II, Margrave of Lower Lusatia, is the first member of the Wettin dynasty, taken as established by his father. He inherited or acquired Wettin Castle during his career, potentially from his father. Theodoric, because his son Dedo held the rank of Count, was presumably Count of Wettin. Little is known about his political career other than that he was a supporter of the Duke of Saxony. He died in 975 in a feud against his son.

Issue
Theodoric had two sons:
Dedo I, Count of Wettin (c. 950 – 1009)
Frederick I, Count of Wettin and Eilenburg (died 1017), with no known issue

Ancestral theories
Thietmar names Theodoric as a member of the tribe of the Buzici (de tribu, quae Buzici dicitur) and as a relative on his father's side of Rikdag, Margrave of Meissen (r. 979–985). Several possible fathers have been identified  for him, but there is no conclusive evidence for any of them:
Dedi, count in the Hassegau (count in 940, died 957), one of the retainers of Otto I, a descendant of Burchard, Duke of Thuringia. Proposed by Friedrich Kurze (1886), based on the name Buzici (Buzo as short form Burchard, i.e. the Buzici would be the Burchardings).
Burchard III, Duke of Swabia (born 906 or 915, died 973), proposed by Reinhard Wenskus (1976) and later Stefan Pätzold (1997), also based on the interpretation of Buzici as a derived from the name Burchard.
Burchard II, Duke of Swabia (died 926): the association with Liesgau is connected to this hypothesis, as a Swabian count named Burchard is attested for Liesgau in 965 (known as Burchard IV. im Hassegau, brother of Dedi I of Hassegau). This Burchard is suggested as the son of Burchard II and an older brother of Theodoric.
Folcmar (Volkmar) count in the Harzgau (died before 961) (suggestion mentioned in Lexikon des Mittelalters.)

Depending on who is assumed to be Theodoric's father, it is reasonable to assume a date of birth for Theodoric in the 910s, 920s or 930s. The year of his death has been proposed as 975/6, because it is known that his son Dedo in this year took his own mother hostage in the context of a feud  (presumably against his father). Theodoric's wife is named as one Jutta or Judith of Merseburg in early modern historiography.

References

Sources
 Albert, Duke of Saxony, Die Wettiner in Lebensbildern, Graz, Wien, Köln (1995).
 
 Kaemmel, Otto, Festschrift zur 800 jährigen Jubelfeier des Hauses Wettin.  Dresden Hoffmann (1889).
 Pätzold, Stefan, Die frühen Wettiner. Adelsfamilie und Hausüberlieferung bis 1221 (1997).
 Posse, Otto, Die Markgrafen von Meissen und das Haus Wettin bis zu Konrad dem Grossen, Leipzig (1881).
 Posse, Otto, Die Wettiner. Genealogie des Gesammthauses Wettin, Leipzig (1897).
 Schwarz, Hilmar, Die Wettiner des Mittelalters und ihre Bedeutung für Thüringen, Leipzig (1994).
 Wenskus, Reinhard, Sächsischer Stammesadel und fränkischer Reichsadel, Vandenhoeck & Ruprecht, Göttingen (1976).

House of Wettin
10th-century births
970s deaths
Year of birth unknown
Year of death uncertain